Charles Robert Moir (November 29, 1930 – November 14, 2019) was an American college basketball coach.  He was the head coach of the Virginia Tech Hokies men's basketball team from 1976 until his resignation in October 1987.  During his 11  seasons at Virginia Tech, Moir's Hokies compiled a 213–119 record. He was forced to resign after the discovery of severe NCAA violations.  Including his time at Tech and coaching stints in high school and at Roanoke College and Tulane University, Moir compiled a career record of 616–238 in his 31 seasons as a high school and college head coach.

He was inducted into the Virginia Sports Hall of Fame (the state-wide organization that honors sports figures who were either from Virginia, or contributed to teams from the state) in 2000.

College Athlete
Moir was a basketball and baseball athlete at Appalachian State University.  Following his college career, Moir played Minor League Baseball with the Cincinnati Reds organization.

College Coach
After three years in baseball, Moir moved on to coach high school basketball, coaching for eleven years in Stuart, Virginia, Jefferson, North Carolina, and Mount Airy, North Carolina and finishing with a career record of 224–43.

In 1963, Moir joined the Virginia Tech basketball coaching staff as an assistant.  After coaching under Bill Matthews and Howard Shannon for four seasons, Moir moved on to Roanoke College where he compiled a 133–44 record in his six years, winning the NCAA College Division (now called Division II) national championship in 1972.

Moir's first recruit at Roanoke was Frankie Allen, the first African American basketball player in school history, who would eventually follow Moir as the head coach of Virginia Tech and become Virginia Tech's first African American head coach.

Moir left Roanoke for Tulane University in 1973, where he earned a 46–33 record.  After three years in New Orleans, he returned to the Hokies and Virginia Tech.

Virginia Tech

Moir became the head coach in 1976, replacing Don DeVoe, who had moved on to Wyoming.  In Moir's first season, the Hokies earned a bid to the NIT, but fell in the second round to #12 Alabama.  In Moir's third season as coach, the Hokies, who had been independent since leaving the Southern Conference some 13 years earlier, joined the upstart Metro Conference.  Tech stunned tournament favorite #13 Louisville in the conference semi-finals and went on to defeat Florida State for the conference championship.

Following Moir's lone losing season with the Hokies (1986–1987), a report presented by Mike Glazier and Michael Slive detailed 12 NCAA violations in Moir's program.  The report found that, "in reviewing the academic records of basketball athletes, it is evident that most are not serious students."  Most seriously, none of Moir's recruits from 1981 to 1986—essentially, what would be his last five recruiting classes—graduated. The most serious were that a player had falsely been given credit for a course he did not take and the wife of another player was given a personal car loan.  Moir himself was cleared of any wrongdoing, but was forced to resign.  Moir's ouster completed a difficult year for the Hokie program; athletics director and football coach Bill Dooley had been pushed out earlier that year.  In October, Virginia Tech's football and basketball programs were placed on two years' probation, and the basketball team was banned from postseason play until the 1989–90 season.  Virginia Tech was placed in the unenviable position of having both football and basketball on NCAA probation.

During his time at Tech, Moir led the Hokies to four NCAA tournament appearances and four NIT appearances.  With a record of 213–119, Moir remains Tech's winningest basketball coach of all time and was inducted into the Virginia Tech Sports Hall of Fame in 2006.

Personal
Moir's son, Page Moir, was the head men's basketball coach at Roanoke College in Salem, Virginia from 1989–2016. The younger Moir played for his father as a walk-on at Virginia Tech in the 1980s. Charles Moir died on November 14, 2019, at age 88 of congestive heart failure.

Head coaching record

College

References

1930 births
2019 deaths
American men's basketball coaches
American men's basketball players
Appalachian State Mountaineers baseball players
Appalachian State Mountaineers men's basketball players
Basketball coaches from North Carolina
Basketball players from North Carolina
College men's basketball head coaches in the United States
High school basketball coaches in North Carolina
High school basketball coaches in Virginia
People from Stokes County, North Carolina
Roanoke Maroons men's basketball coaches
Tulane Green Wave men's basketball coaches
Virginia Tech Hokies men's basketball coaches